The 7th Pennsylvania Reserve Regiment, also known as the 36th Regiment Pennsylvania Volunteer Infantry, was a regiment in the Union Army during the American Civil War. It formed part of the Pennsylvania Reserve division in the Army of the Potomac for most of the war. The regiment served in a number of important battles throughout the Eastern Theater, including Antietam and Fredericksburg.

Organization

Service
The 7th Pennsylvania Reserves were organized at Camp Curtin in Harrisburg, Pennsylvania.  They were ordered to Washington D.C. on July 21st and mustered into United States service July 27, 1861.  Elisha B. Harvey, of Wilkes-Barre, Pennsylvania, served as the regiment's first colonel, Joseph Totten as lieutenant colonel and Chauncey A. Lyman as major. It was sent to Washington, D.C., where the division was assigned to the I Corps of the Army of the Potomac. The I Corps remained in northern Virginia instead of following the rest of the Army for the Peninsula Campaign in 1862. In May, due to Maj. Gen. George B. McClellan's demands for reinforcements, the division was sent the Peninsula as well.

In August 1862, the Army of the Potomac was transferred to northern Virginia to support the Army of Virginia. The 7th Pennsylvania Reserves then fought at Turner's Gap in the Battle of South Mountain, at the Battle of Antietam, and at the Battle of Fredericksburg on December 12. The Seventh Reserves distinguished themselves at Fredericksburg by capturing over 100 of the enemy, along with the battle flag of the Nineteenth Georgia Infantry, the only trophy seized during the battle.

At the Battle of the Wilderness, on May 5, 1864, the entire regiment—except for Company B -- found itself hopelessly surrounded by Confederate troops, and was compelled to surrender. 272 officers and men were captured, and were immediately marched to the rear of the rebel army at Orange Court House, and thence to Lynchburg, Virginia. The enlisted men were speedily conveyed to the infamous rebel prison pen at Andersonville, Georgia, and the officers were sent to Camp Oglethorpe in Macon, Georgia, and were subsequently placed under fire of Union guns at Charleston, for the protection of the city. The prisoners were held until the end of the conflict was near, with some being paroled, and some liberated by Union troops, but with many enlisted dying from starvation, disease and exposure in the period leading up to release.

The regiment was mustered out on June 16, 1864.

Casualties
The 7th Pennsylvania Reserves lost 3 officers and 80 enlisted men killed and mortally wounded in battle, and 135 enlisted men dead for reasons not directly caused in action (disease, etc.) -- 67 of these at Andersonville, and an undetermined number after the captives were moved to Florence, South Carolina, totalling 218 fatalities.

Commanders
 Col. Elisha B. Harvey, June 26, 1861, to July 4, 1862 (resigned)
 Col. Henry C. Bolinger (Capt. of Company D 6/26/1861, to Lt. Col. 5/5/1862, then Col. 8/1/1862; captured at the Wilderness, May 5, 1864; sent to Macon, GA)
 Capt. Samuel B. King (of Company H), May 1864 to June 16, 1864 (mustered out)

See also
Pennsylvania Reserves
Pennsylvania in the Civil War

Notes

References
 
 
Attribution

The Civil War Archive
Pennsylvania in the Civil War

External links
The Pennsylvania Reserve Volunteer Corps Historical Society

Units and formations of the Union Army from Pennsylvania
Pennsylvania Reserves
1861 establishments in Pennsylvania
Military units and formations established in 1861
Military units and formations disestablished in 1864